"The Morning After Baby Let Me Down" is a song written and recorded by Canadian country music artist Ray Griff. Released in 1971, the song reached the top 20 on both the RPM Country Tracks chart in Canada and the Billboard Hot Country Singles chart in the United States. In 1977, Canadian country singer Carroll Baker covered the song and released it as the third single from her album Sweet Sensation. The song reached number one on the RPM Country Tracks chart in Canada in November 1977.

Chart performance

Ray Griff

Carroll Baker

References

1971 singles
1977 singles
Ray Griff songs
Carroll Baker songs
Songs written by Ray Griff
Dot Records singles
1971 songs